Artemas Ward (1727–1800) was an American major general in the American Revolutionary War and a U.S. Representative from Massachusetts.

Artemas Ward may also refer to:

 Artemas Ward Jr. (1762–1847), son of Artemas Ward, also a U.S. Representative from Massachusetts
 Artemas Ward (writer) (1848–1925), great-grandson of Artemas Ward, American author and advertising executive, writer of The Grocer's Encyclopedia

See also
 Artemus Ward (1834–1867), pen name of Charles Farrar Browne, American humor writer
 Statue of Artemas Ward, a 1936 statue in Ward Circle, Washington, D.C.
 SS Artemas Ward, a U.S. Liberty ship used in World War II

Ward, Artemas